Annie Laurie Gunter (born Annie Laurie Cain; June 23, 1919 – July 9, 2005) was an American politician who served as the Treasurer of Alabama from 1978 to 1987.

She died of heart failure on July 9, 2005, in Montgomery, Alabama at age 86.

References

1919 births
2005 deaths
State treasurers of Alabama
Alabama Democrats
Women state constitutional officers of Alabama
Politicians from Montgomery, Alabama
20th-century American women
20th-century American people
21st-century American women